Katharine Round is an English documentary filmmaker. She is co-founder of the production company Disobedient Films, and Doc Heads; a dedicated documentary screening organization that promotes the work of documentary filmmakers, with

a focus on independent, artistic work.

As of 2016, Round's most recent completed film project is The Divide; which she directed and produced (co-producer Christopher Hird).

References

External links 

 

Year of birth missing (living people)
Living people
English women in business
English documentary filmmakers
English women film directors
English film producers
Place of birth missing (living people)
Women documentary filmmakers